Edward L. Trobaugh (born 7 November 1932) is a former United States Army Major General.

Early life and education
Trobaugh graduated from Kokomo High School in 1950.

Career
Trobaugh attended West Point graduating in 1955 and was commissioned a second lieutenant after graduation.

1955-1967
He served with the 3rd Armored Division in West Germany from 1959-61.

Vietnam War
From 1967 to 1968 Trobaugh served in South Vietnam in the 1st Infantry Division.

In April 1970 Trobaugh was appointed to command the 2nd Battalion, 7th Cavalry Regiment replacing Lt Col. Hannas who had been seriously wounded in a People's Army of Vietnam (PAVN) attack on Firebase Jay on 29 March. 2/7 Cavalry moved to a new base, Firebase Atkinson after the attack on Jay and it too came under attack in the early hours of 16 April 1970 and Trobaugh was slightly wounded while leading the defense of the base.

1970s to 1987
From 1971-3 he attended the United States Army War College. In 1975 he took command of the 2nd Brigade, 25th Infantry Division.

In July 1980 BG Trobaugh became assistant commandant of the United States Army Infantry School.

In 1981 Trobaugh was promoted to Major General and from August 1981 he served as Military Assistance Advisory Group, Spain.

Trobaugh served as commander of the 82nd Airborne Division from 24 June 1983 to 19 June 1985 and during this time led the division in the US invasion of Grenada. During the operation the Chairman of the Joint Chiefs of Staff, General John Vessey, reportedly called MG Trobaugh and said “We have two companies of Marines running all over the island and thousands of Army troops doing nothing. What the hell is going on?”

His final assignment was as Deputy Commander, Fifth Army.

Trobaugh retired from active service in 1987.

Personal life
After retiring from the U.S. Army in 1987, he returned to Kokomo Indiana.

References

1932 births
United States Army generals
Recipients of the Distinguished Service Medal (US Army)
Recipients of the Silver Star
Living people
People from Logansport, Indiana
United States Military Academy alumni
United States Army personnel of the Vietnam War
Military personnel from Indiana
People from Kokomo, Indiana